is a Japanese manga series written and illustrated by Wataru Momose. It was serialized in Shueisha's Shōnen Jump+ website from July 2019 to June 2020, with its chapters collected into four tankōbon volumes. An original net animation adaptation by DOMERICA was released on Netflix in October 2022.

Plot
One day, a wizard claimed as "love cupid" named Riri appears before Anzu Hoshino, a high school girl who has no interest in romance outside of video game characters. The world where Riri comes from is founded on giving dreams and hopes to children, and collecting their pure hearts as energy in return. Due to declining birthrate assumed by the decrease in romance opportunities between men and women, Riri is sent to assist Anzu in experiencing real life romance with a pool of "ikemen" for her to choose from. Despite Anzu's rejection due to her zero interest in pursuing real-life romance, Riri confiscated her "three greatest desires", video games, chocolate, and her cat, Momohiki, and conspired a series of events to make Anzu encounter shōjo manga-esque situations, leaving her with no choice. Anzu decided to play along with Riri's "game", but hopes to make Riri give up and release his "hostages" by avoiding all the romance-possible situations with all of her might so she can go back to her normal life. Along the way, Anzu establishes genuine connections with the romantic candidates, and has to navigate their feelings - and her desire to protect them from Riri's schemes - with increased difficulty.

Characters

The protagonist who bears the "anti-heroine" attribute. A high school first year who claims her three great desires are video games, cats (especially her pet Momohiki), and chocolate. She has no interest in real life romance and has been counter-measuring all the shōjo manga-esque situations conspired by Riri. She is logical, blunt, and very caring person who can't leave her friends when they're in trouble. She cares little for how strangers perceive her, and will always stay true to her internal sense of right and wrong. She is well known for her bushy red hair, her love of cat-themed clothes, and her biggest fear is cockroaches.

A mascot-type wizard who was sent to assists Anzu in pursuing romance. He appears to be cunning and manipulative; resorting to anything possible just so Anzu can encounter shōjo manga-like situations. He can shapeshift into a boy, going by Rio, or girl, Riri, claiming either to be Anzu's "cousin", and often uses either of these forms to spur Anzu along or spark jealousy between candidates. It is revealed that he never ever once manipulated any of the boys' feelings or memory; claiming their affections toward Anzu are real. After violating his work policy, Riri was replaced by another wizard named Kate to assist Anzu, but Anzu brought him back by adding Riri as a romance candidate after Riri revealed his wish to stay by her side.

A cold and reserved boy who is Anzu's first romance candidate. He is popular among women due to his good looks but tends to avoid them, rejecting any romantic proposals outright. He meets Anzu in a meet cute where she accidentally bumps into him and breaks his phone. Due to Riri's meddling, his house is flooded and he has to live with Anzu early in the story. It is later revealed that before transferring schools he was a warm and caring person who could "befriend anyone", indicating that his cold appearance is a facade. His personality changed drastically after being repeatedly stalked by an older woman he had helped once, to the point where he was forced to transfer from his house and school to be away from her and his strict father who blamed him for the situation. He then became lonely and distant after living alone. In an effort to distance himself from women's attention, he often wears hats in public and experiences panic attacks if left alone with them due to traumatic memories. He finally realizes his hidden feelings for Anzu after she helps him many times, considering her to be his savior.

The "childhood friend" that Riri set up for Anzu. Anzu originally believed him to be a random hot guy brainwashed by Riri, but it is later revealed that he is in fact a childhood friend of Anzu whom she called "Tonta" who looked completely different back then, and that his feelings for Anzu are genuine. Tonta was shy, heavy-set, and found it difficult to make friends before he met Anzu and bonded with her over the fictional video game Cat Ranger. He has grown very tall and muscular, and is known as the "rookie baseball star" at his school. It is later revealed that he had picked up baseball and changed himself after overhearing Anzu say that she would like to date an "athletic guy who can beat the boss." Anzu is aware of his feelings for her, and acts oblivious to hide it from him. He is sincere and somewhat cowardly, also hiding from cockroaches like Anzu, but is not afraid to physically confront anyone who hurts his friends.

A wealthy boy who is not in touch with the lives of "peasants", also set up by Riri for Anzu. He meets Anzu in a twist on a classic anime meet cute, where she is running late to school and is hit by his car. He takes her on a date for compensation, assuming she got hit on purpose, and is shocked when she rejects him. He is not used to having girls reject him so he tries to woo Anzu by buying her off. After being called out further by Anzu, he tries to navigate common life by getting a job at the convenience store that Anzu works at and getting his own money. Knowing how much Hijiri was used to getting what he wanted, his father had transferred him from his former private school so that he could learn to fend for himself. It is shown that he too gradually developed a romantic interest in Anzu, as well as a hot and cold "tsundere" personality.

Hijiri Koganei's chauffeur who cares for him deeply. He offers romantic advice to Hijiri, and at times appears as a joke romance candidate, considered equally handsome to the candidates. He can appear by Hijiri's side at the click of a finger, and gets emotional when Hijiri expresses gratitude to him. He genuinely appreciates Anzu's presence in Hijiri's life, and considers her to be a very good influence on him. Unfortunately, because of the amount of girls who have flung themselves in front of his car to get to Hijiri, he is on a watch list.

Anzu's best female friend at school. She treasures her bond with Anzu as Anzu had defended her during her difficult time in middle school. She met Anzu when she was shoved down by a jealous school bully, and Anzu forced the bully to apologize. Since then, she has come to rely on Anzu to save her, and wants to support Anzu in her own way. Like Tsukasa, she is very popular, and has had to deal with unwanted advances from those around her. In particular, in middle school, she dated a seemingly kind senior classmate after being asked out by him everyday. At first he acts like the perfect gentleman, but attempted to force himself on her when they were alone. He attempted to spread rumors about her to the school to cover his actions, but Anzu confronts him. Because of the courage Anzu has given her, she has become someone not to be messed with, and is unafraid of shooting lecherous comments down, countering them with equally personal questions. She finds about Anzu living with Tsukasa and Junta and promises to keep it a secret.

Tsukasa Kazuki's easygoing and reliable friend. He is somewhat air-headed and oblivious, but because of his kind personality, Tsukasa can let his guard down around him. He is puzzled by Tsukasa's cold attitude to girls, and often apologizes on his friend's behalf. Before Anzu, Makoto was Tsukasa's only friend at this new school. He has older sisters who are boorish and slovenly around his house, which has made him less interested in having a dating life. He admires Junta for his athleticism and handsomeness, fawning over how cool Junta must be. When Saki was uncomfortable after seeing her middle school abuser at a Summer Festival, Makoto was able to read the signs and swoop Saki away by the hand. It is implied that Saki was impressed by this, and that she may be developing feelings for him.  

Tsukasa Kazuki's kind older sister. Her and Tsukasa are both very attractive, becoming a pair of siblings that are "blindingly beautiful." She first encounters Anzu when Anzu is harassed after spilling a stranger's coffee. She comes to Anzu's rescue, and when she sees Anzu and her brother together, she immediately sees potential for their relationship. She is very supportive of her younger brother, as she has protected him from the past from their father, and Tsukasa's stalker. She is protective of Tsukasa, and is thankful that Anzu is by Tsukasa's side. She tends to tease Anzu and Tsukasa, although she is not overly pushy considering Tsukasa's past.

Tsukasa Kazuki's unstable stalker. She is a young woman in her twenties who was bullied at her workplace. Because she was outcast, she was "saved" by Tsukasa when he helped her up after she fell, and gave her bag back to her. This later becomes his greatest regret. She exhibits many yandere stalking tendencies, such as waiting for Tsukasa before and after school, sending him packages under false names, and even drugging him so they can be alone in his room. She also hacks his online accounts to frame their relationship as romantic. This tarnishes Tsukasa's reputation, and forces him to move away, but she finds him through the background of a candid social media photo. Tsukasa's mother, Arisa, and Anzu are all "horrible" in her eyes, as they try to tear "their love" apart. She assaults Anzu, but gets arrested. Yukana is sent to a medical facility when Hijiri uses his family connections to put a stop to her Uncle bribing the authorities. Even hospitalized, she is fixated on Tsukasa, and the only way to stop her is for Riri to wipe her memories. Once wiped, the threat seems to disappear, but Riri's co-worker Cupid, Kate, is assigned Yukana as their client in a cliffhanger ending.

Media

Manga
Written and illustrated by Wataru Momose, Romantic Killer was serialized in Shueisha's Shōnen Jump+ website from July 30, 2019, to June 2, 2020. The first tankōbon volume was released on December 4, 2019. The second to fourth volumes were released digitally on March 4, August 4, and September 4, 2020; the volumes were released in print on October 4, 2022.

In February 2022, Viz Media announced that they licensed the series for English publication.

Volume list

Anime
In August 2022, the Shōnen Jump+ website announced that the series would be adapted into an original net animation. It is produced by DOMERICA and directed by Kazuya Ichikawa, with Sayuri Ōba and Hiroko Fukuda overseeing the scripts, Arisa Matsuura designing the characters, and Ryo Kawasaki and Tomoyuki Kono composing the music. The series was released on Netflix on October 27, 2022. The opening theme is "ROMA☆KiRA" by YURiKA, while the ending theme is ""Romantic Love ~Renai Shimasen ka?☆~ (Won't You Fall in Love)" by Mikako Komatsu.

Episode list

Reception 
The series was the first place winner of the second of Shonen Jump's Vertical Scroll Manga Awards. In 2020, the series ranked 12th in the Next Manga Awards in the web manga category.

References

External links
 

2022 anime ONAs
Anime series based on manga
Comedy-drama anime and manga
Japanese-language Netflix original programming
Japanese webcomics
Netflix original anime
Romantic comedy anime and manga
Shōnen manga
Shueisha manga
Viz Media manga
Webcomics in print